The Oxford University Diplomatic Studies Programme (formerly known as the Foreign Service Programme) is a long-running programme of courses offered by the University of Oxford in the field of diplomacy. The programme was originally established in 1969 in partnership with the Foreign, Commonwealth and Development Office, with the intention of educating diplomats of newly independent Commonwealth countries. The programme has since run continuously, celebrating its fiftieth anniversary in 2019, and now consists of a Master of Studies (MSt) in Diplomatic Studies.  It is customised for professionals, typically early to mid-career diplomats and other international relations practitioners who seek the combination of academic and vocational study. The annual intake has a global reach, and participants come from a wide range of countries. Over its many years within the university, alumni of the programme have included royalty and heads of state, as well as senior government figures from all over the world.

History
Building on a long history of Oxbridge being linked to the British civil service, in 1926, Oxford and Cambridge jointly ran a Tropical African Services Course on behalf of the British Colonial Office. This programme continued in varying forms and under different names for another forty-three years, as the Colonial Administrative Service Course (1934), the Devonshire Course (1945), Course ‘A’ and ‘B’ (1953), the Overseas Service Course (1962) and, finally, the Overseas Course in Government and Development (1964).

As many Commonwealth states gained independence, their governments sought trained diplomats to staff their Foreign Services. In response to this need, in the 1960s, the Overseas Course was adapted to allow for a small Foreign Service component, morphing, in 1964, into a coherent and more integrated Foreign Service Training Course under the auspices of the Overseas Service Course. Examinations were instituted in 1966.

When the Overseas Service Course was discontinued in 1969, the Foreign Service element of that course was transformed into the Foreign Service Programme, based out of Queen Elizabeth House. In the decades that followed, the programme expanded its audience to governments in the Middle East, Latin America, and Asia. After the Fall of the Berlin Wall, the Foreign, Commonwealth and Development Office requested places be made available to newly independent, former Soviet countries to help build their diplomatic capacity. In 2010, the programme moved to the Department for Continuing Education within the university, and in 2017 it changed its name to the Diplomatic Studies Programme reflecting the more common terminology in the modern academic field.

Notable alumni
A number of significant government figures and heads of state have been a part of the Diplomatic Studies Programme or its predecessor the Foreign Service Programme. Alumni have included:

 Jigme Khesar Namgyel Wangchuck, King of Bhutan
 Benazir Bhutto, former Prime Minister of Pakistan
 Haitham bin Tariq, Sultan of Oman
 Enele Sopoaga, Prime Minister of Tuvalu
 Ratu Epeli Nailatikau, former President of Fiji
 Tupoutoʻa ʻUlukalala, Crown Prince of Tonga
 Haji Al-Muhtadee Billah, Crown Prince of Brunei
 Grigol Mgaloblishvili, former Prime Minister of Georgia
 Sultan Muhammad V, former Yang di-Pertuan Agong (head of state of Malaysia)
 Amina Mohamed, former Cabinet Secretary for Foreign Affairs of Kenya
Ambassador (Dr) Adeyemi Dipeolu, Special Adviser to the President on Economic Matters in the Office of the Vice President of Nigeria

Directors
 1969-1986: Ralph Feltham
 1986-1987: Anthony Kirk-Greene
 1987-1988: Philip McKearney
 1988-1990: Anthony Kirk-Greene
 1990-1995: Sir John Johnson
 1995-1999: Sir Robin Fearn
 1999-2003: Christopher Long
 2003-2010: Alan Hunt
 2003-2006: Rodney Hall (Academic Director)
 2010-2015: Jeremy Cresswell
 2015-2019: Kate Jones
 2020: Dr Vahid Nick Pay and Dr Charles Boyle (interim directors)
 2021–present: Dr Yolanda Kemp Spies

References

External links
 Oxford University Diplomatic Studies Programme

1969 establishments in England
Diplomatic Studies Programme
Diplomatic Studies Programme
United Kingdom foreign policy